Ivan Jacky Minnaert is a Belgian football coach who is currently assigned to Al-Ittihad Tripoly of the Libyan Premier League as of 2018/2019.Ivan  holds the UEFA Pro Licence, the highest football coaching qualification. He received the UEFA Pro Licence in 2012 from the Football Association of Spain.

Ivan Minnaert is a proponent of Gegenpressing, whereby the team, after losing possession, immediately attempts to win back possession, rather than falling back to regroup. His sides have been described playing attacking football in reference to their pressing and high attacking output.

Career

Mali

Presented the head coach of Djoliba AC in autumn 2014, Minnaert set his sights on staying at the club for ten years and earning at least one trophy for them but stepped down from his position in 2015 when Djoliba games were invalidated, causing relegation to the second division before visiting Mali again in 2017.

Kenya

Negotiating a contract with AFC Leopards of the Kenyan Premier League in early 2016, the Belgian inked a two-year deal with Ingwe in late February, ending the unbeaten run of 35 games in the KPL of Gor Mahia,  voted KPL coach of the month March but was fired by August for poor results, including a six-game winless run, despite being second early on, with some urging him to step down beforehand. In the end, he decided to sue AFC Leopards for salaries owed, which amounted to 24000 US dollars.

Guinea

Replacing Adda Benamar at AS Kaloum Star in mid 2017, Minnaert made the quarterfinals of the Guinée Coupe Nationale, his task was to escape relegation what he did.

South Africa

Assisting fellow Belgian Jean-François Losciuto at Black Leopards of the South African National First Division in late autumn 2017, the former director became caretaker of the team a few days later, making it the objective to achieve promotion and applied an offensive system in the team. However, when directing them to 10th place in 15 matches, he was slated to be fired.

Rwanda

Accepting a six-month contract with Mukura Victory at the start of 2017, the former Rayon Sport coach pledged to improve results and turn around the season, beating Pepiniere 1-0 in his debut  at the end of his contract arranging a deal  with AS Kaloum Star of Guinea that summer.

Head coach of Rayon Sports of the Rwanda National Football League from November 2015 to February 2016, he was awarded another contract with Gikundiro in spring 2018, taking them to the 2018 CAF Confederation Cup, historic qualification of a Rwandian team,  where they were pooled with USM Alger, Young Africans, and Gor Mahia in Group D and stated that reaching the quarterfinals would be an onerous task.

Libya
Appointed as technical director of the academy and head coach of the U20, the 3 teams under his supervision win all the games of the league (U15 : 9 wins ; U17 : 9 wins ; U20 : 9 wins)
In a friendly game against the first team, the team he coached (the U20) impress everybody.
A few weeks later he take over the first team and started with a 2-0 win against AlIttihad Misrata, after a 3-0 win against Rafeeq the league stopped in April due to the circumstances in the country. 
After a break of 4 months he started a short preparation of 2 weeks to classify Al Ittihad for the 1/16 finals of the CAF Confederation cup against USGN of Niger (1-1 away game and 2-0 win home game)
Stats : First division Libyan league : 2 Games 2 Wins (goals 5-0)
Caf Confederation Cup : 2 Games 1 draw 1 win (goals 3-1)

CAF Competitions

CAF CHAMPIONS LEAGUE : WINS 3 DRAW 1 LOST 1
CAF CONFEDERATION CUP : WINS 4 DRAW 2 LOST 2
CAF GROUP STAGE : WINS 2 DRAW 3 LOST 1

References

External links
  : History as Rayon Sports Fc storms CAF Confederation Cup Group Stage 
  : FOOTRwanda, le Rayon d'espoir
   : Journeyman Minnaert begins Ittihad spell in Niamey
  : Champions Gor Mahia suffer a shocking 1-0 loss to AFC Leopards at the Kasarani Stadium
  : Minnaert named coach of the month 
 Futaa.com tag 
 [www.newtimes.co.rw/section/read/204599 Rayon in talks with Belgian Minnaert over marketing role] 
 Former Ingwe tactician ready to replace Frank Nutall 
 Spanish Coach seeks football opportunity in Nigeria 
 Minnaert: Kateregga doesn’t want to play for me 
 Rayon Sports' Ivan Minnaert pledges open CAF Champions League rematch with Mamelodi Sundowns 
 at Footballdatabase.eu 
 
 Mega Pro Football Academy Profile
 : Belgian Ivan Minnaert: 'Working in Libya is not that bad 
  : Precious away draw for Ittihad against Gendarmerie 

Living people
Expatriate football managers in Spain
Belgian football managers
Belgian expatriate football managers
Expatriate football managers in Rwanda
Black Leopards F.C. managers
Expatriate football managers in Guinea
Expatriate football managers in the Maldives
Belgian footballers
Belgian expatriate sportspeople in Spain
Expatriate football managers in Libya
Expatriate soccer managers in South Africa
Expatriate football managers in Kenya
Expatriate football managers in Mali
Association footballers not categorized by position
Djoliba AC managers
Al-Ittihad Tripoli managers
Year of birth missing (living people)
A.F.C. Leopards managers